Tetragonoderus stephaniae is a species of beetle in the family Carabidae. It was described by G.Muller in 1942.

References

stephaniae
Beetles described in 1942